The partial list of political families of West Bengal state of India.

Bose Family
 Netaji Subhas Chandra Bose
 Sarat Chandra Bose, freedom fighter, Bengal politician, member of Constituent Assembly of India
 Amiya Nath Bose, son of Sarat, MP from Forward Bloc
Dr Sisir Kumar Bose, son of Sarat, MP from Forward Bloc
 Subrata Bose, son of Sarat, MP from All India Forward Bloc
 Prof Krishna Bose, wife of Sishir, MP from All India Trinamool Congress
 Prof Sugata Bose, son of Sishir, MP from All India Trinamool Congress
Amit Mitra, former Finance Minister in the Government of West Bengal

Khan Family
 A. B. A. Ghani Khan Choudhury, Union Minister of Railways in  Third Indira Gandhi ministry and established the Kolkata Metro.
 Abu Hasem Khan Choudhury, MP from Indian National Congress.
 Isha Khan Choudhury, former MLA from Indian National Congress
 Abu Nasar Khan Choudhury, former MLA from Congress, member of All India Trinamool Congress
 Rubi Noor, former MLA from Indian National Congress
 Mausam Noor, former MP from Indian National Congress, member of All India Trinamool Congress
 Sonya Noor, American vascular surgeon

Adhikari Family
 Sisir Adhikari, sitting MP from Bharatiya Janata Party
 Suvendu Adhikari, sitting MLA & Leader of Opposition from Bharatiya Janata party.
 Dibyendu Adhikari, sitting MP from All India Trinamool Congress.

Das Family
'Deshbandhu'Chittaranjan Das
Siddhartha Shankar Ray, grandson of Chittaranjan Das, former Chief Minister of West Bengal

A. Mukherjee Family
Ashutosh Mukherjee
Syama Prasad Mookerjee Served as Minister for Industry and Supply under Prime Minister Jawaharlal Nehru's cabinet and latter founded Bharatiya Jana Sangh

Dasmunsi Family
Priya Ranjan Dasmunsi, former cabinet minister
Deepa Dasmunsi, former Minister of State for Urban Development

Konar Family
Hare Krishna Konar, freedom fighter and politician, one of the founding member of Communist Consolidation and later one of the Co-founder of Communist Party of India (Marxist), first Minister of Land and Land Reforms
Benoy Krishna Konar, Former MLA and president of All India Kisan Sabha, younger brother of Hare Krishna Konar

Naidu Family
Sarojini Naidu, freedom fighter and poet
Padmaja Naidu, Former Governor of West Bengal, daughter of Sarojini Naidu

Mukherjee Family
Pranab Mukherjee, Senior INC leader and former President of India
Abhijit Mukherjee, Member of Parliament from the Jangipur (Lok Sabha constituency) in West Bengal

Banerjee Family
Mamata Banerjee, founder of All India Trinamool Congress, Chief Minister of West Bengal
Abhishek Banerjee, MP of Diamond Harbour, president of AITMCP, AITMYC

Singh Family
Arjun Singh, MP from Barrackpore, MLA of Bhatpara, Chairman of Bhatpara Municipality, senior member of All India Trinamool Congress
Sunil Singh, MLA of Noapara, Chairman of Garulia Municipality
Umashankar Singh, senior leader and president of Bharatiya Janata party

Ahmed Family
 Sultan Ahmed, MP and former Union Minister of State for Tourism Department, government of India
 Sajda Ahmed, wife of Sultan, MP from the Uluberia constituency 
 Iqbal Ahmed, brother of Sultan, MLA and former deputy mayor of Kolkata

Chatterjee Family

 Nirmal Chandra Chatterjee, MP from Hoogly 
 Somnath Chatterjee, Son of Nirmal, Speaker of the Lok Sabha and MP from Bolpur

References 

 
West Bengal
West Bengal-related lists